Ist (styled as ist) were an English rock music group based in Leicester, England. Their name is meant to denote a lack of prejudice. They are broadly speaking, a pop/rock group, but with a penchant for genre-jumping that has seen ska, jazz, blues and classical influences find their way on to their albums.

History
Ist was formed in March 2001, the original line-up consisting of Canadian singer/songwriter Kenton Hall, lead guitarist/songwriter Jack Bomb, bassist Detroit Robbins and drummer Mark "Flash" Haynes.

The original line-up toured extensively throughout the UK following the releases of The Adult Tree EP in 2001 and the album Freudian Corduroy in 2003.

The year 2004 saw setbacks for Ist. Lead guitarist and contributing lyricist Jack Bomb left the band to form Vitriol I.D. in August, and in October bassist Detroit Robbins died. The remaining members chose to move forward adding bassist John McCourt. In September 2005, Brett Richardson (guitars and bassoon) joined ist, following guest appearances on their second album.

Ist's second album, King Martha, was released in August 2005. It features Kenton Hall, Mark "Flash" Haynes, John McCourt, with Brett Richardson and Paul Swannell, as well as a group of contributing artists including Kevin Hewick, The Have Nots, The Swinging Laurels, and former member Jack Bomb. The album features a wide array of horns, as well as string sections and a bassoon in addition to traditional rock instruments such as guitar, bass and drums.

In 2006, Ist released the single "The Wreck of the Eddie Fitzpatrick/I am Jesus (And You're Not)" in direct response to a conversation with performer, songwriter and presenter Tom Robinson.

In 2008, Kenton Hall from Ist was one of the co-writers of Chris Difford's Christmas single for BBC1's The One Show, "Let's Not Fight This Christmas". Songs co-written by Hall have also appeared on releases from other artists, including the song "Grace" on Madelaine Hart's "LAA" EP, released on the Creative Commons label modifythevan. He is currently working on songs with a number of other artists, including Chaz Jankel.

In August 2009, Ist released Toothpick Bridge, produced by Jay "Burzootie" Burnett. The Swinging Laurels, (Gaz Birtles, John Barrow and Dean Sargent) once again provided brass, along with Jay Lyndsay, and they were also joined by renowned pedal steel player Melvin Duffy and vocalist Dorie Jackson, amongst others.

In October 2010, Ist played one final gig, their Obistuary, at The Musician, in their native Leicester. They were supported by the musical comedian, Boothby Graffoe.

In 2011, Kenton Hall embarked on a solo career and has taken to the stage as an actor. John McCourt was playing for the Pink Box outfit, Mr Plow, and recording solo material. Flash had formed the Beatles tribute act Hamburg62, and continues to work with Kevin Hewick. Brett Richardson ventured deeper into his studio recording, mixing and mastering for a real mix of artists.

Public response
Ist have received a positive reaction from independent media.

In 2006 songwriter Kenton Hall received a nomination for MOJO Magazine/Bavaria's Music of Substance Award, alongside fellow Leicester songwriter, Kevin Hewick

The group's sound has been compared to artists such as Elvis Costello, Squeeze, Nick Cave, The E Street Band, Ray Davies, Television and The Beatles. Fans include the novelist Neil Gaiman.

Ist have received positive response in Russian where the album King Martha reached no. 1 on the Russian legal music download site yanga.ru in June 2006, with debut album Freudian Corduroy occupying the number two spot.

Discography
2001 The Adult Tree EP (Pink Box Records)
2003 Freudian Corduroy (Pink Box Records/The Orchard)
2005 King Martha (Pink Box Records/The Orchard)
2006 The Wreck of the Eddie Fitzpatrick/I am Jesus (And You're Not) (Pink Box Records)
2009 Toothpick Bridge

References

External links
Official website
Myspace profile
Review of album King Martha
Pink Box Records
Flash's drum school website

English rock music groups
Musical groups from Leicester